Beradze is a Georgian surname and may refer to:

 Besik Beradze (born 1968), retired Georgian professional football player
 Rima Beradze (born 1955), Georgian politician

Georgian-language surnames
Surnames of Georgian origin